Jones is a surname common in the English-speaking world. This list provides links to biographies of people who share this common surname.

Arts and entertainment

Architecture
Inigo Jones (1573–1652), English architect of Welsh descent
George Howell Jones (1887–1950), American architect from Oregon
Owen Jones (1809–1874), English-born Welsh architect

Acting
Angus T. Jones (born 1993), American actor
Bruce Jones (actor) (born 1953), English actor
Carolyn Jones (1930–1983), American actress
Catherine Zeta-Jones (born 1969), Welsh actress (nee Jones)
Charlie Jones (actor), English actor
Cherry Jones (born 1956), American actress
Chloe Jones (1975–2005), American porn actress
Christopher Jones (1941–2014), American actor
Darby Jones (1910–1986), American actor
Dean Jones (actor) (1931–2015), American actor
Dorothy Jones, birth name of Nida Blanca (1936–2001), Filipino actress
Duane Jones (1937–1988), American actor and theatre director
Emilia Jones (born 2002), English actress
Felicity Jones (born 1983), English actress
Finn Jones (born 1988), English actor
Freddie Jones (1927–2019), English actor
Gemma Jones (born 1942), English actress
Griff Rhys Jones (born 1953), Welsh comedian
James Earl Jones (born 1931), American actor
January Jones (born 1978), American actress
Jasmine Cephas Jones (born 1989), American actress
Jennifer Jones (1919–2009), American actress
Julian Lewis Jones (born 1968), Welsh actor
Katie Rowley Jones, English musical theatre actress
Ken Jones (actor) (1940–2014), English actor
L. Q. Jones (1927–2022), American actor and director
Leslie Jones (comedian) (born 1967), American comedian and actress
Mark Lewis Jones (born 1964), Welsh actor
Mei Jones (1953–2021), Welsh actor and writer
Michael Jones (actor) (born 1987), American actor
Nicky Jones (born 1996), American kid actor
Orlando Jones (born 1968), American comedian and actor
Rashida Jones (born 1976), American actress
Renée Jones (born 1958), American actress
Rob Brydon (born 1965), Welsh actor and comedian; real name Robert Brydon Jones
Ronalda Jones, Canadian actress and writer
 Rosie Jones (comedian) (born 1990), British comedian and actress
Ruth Jones (born 1966), Welsh actress and writer
Shirley Jones (born 1934), American actress
Simon Jones (actor), English actor
Suranne Jones (born 1978), English actress
Tamala Jones (born 1974), American actress
Terry Jones (1942–2020), Welsh comedian, actor and writer, member of the Monty Python
Toby Jones (born 1966), English actor
Tommy Lee Jones (born 1946), American actor
Tyler Patrick Jones (born 1994), American actor

Animation
Chuck Jones (1912–2002), American cartoonist

Dance 
Lana Jones, Australian ballet dancer
Ludie Jones (1916–2018), American tap dancer

Fashion
Grace Jones (born 1948), Jamaican-American model, actress, and singer
Stephen Jones (milliner) (born 1957), British milliner

Music
Adam Jones (musician) (born 1965), guitarist of the band Tool
Aled Jones (born 1970), Welsh singer, who started out as a choirboy and is now a popular baritone
Andrew "Jr. Boy" Jones (born 1948), American Texas blues guitarist, singer and songwriter
Anton Jones (c. 1937–2016), Sri Lankan Burgher bayila musician
Ayron Jones (born 1986), American guitarist, singer and songwriter
Brian Jones (1942–1969), English multi-instrumentalist, founder and original leader of band The Rolling Stones
Calvin "Fuzz" Jones (1926–2010), American electric blues bassist and singer
Camille Jones (born 1973), Danish singer-songwriter
Caryl Parry Jones (born 1958), Welsh singer-songwriter and radio presenter
Cliff Jones (musician) (born 1968), singer with Britpop band Gay Dad, writer and producer
Daniel Jones (composer) (1912–1993), Welsh classical composer
Danny Jones (born 1986), English singer and guitarist, member of pop group McFly
Darryl Jones (born 1961), American jazz bassist
David Robert Jones (1947–2016), birth name of David Bowie, English singer-songwriter and actor 
Davy Jones (musician) (1945–2012), English musician, member of The Monkees, and actor
Della Jones (born 1946), Welsh operatic mezzo-soprano
Dennis Jones (musician) (born 1958), American blues rock singer, guitarist, and songwriter 
Dominique Jones (born 1994), American rapper known professionally as Lil Baby
Donell Jones (born 1973), American R&B singer-songwriter-producer
Donovan Jones, bassist of the band This Will Destroy You
Dora Herbert Jones (1890–1974), Welsh administrator and singer
Elvin Jones (1927–2014), American drummer for John Coltrane
Etta Jones (1928–2001), American jazz singer
Frances Môn Jones (1919–2000), Welsh harpist and teacher
George Jones (1931–2013), American country music singer-songwriter and guitarist
Golden jones (born 2000) American pop rap artist aka 24kGoldn
Gloria Jones (born 1945), American singer and songwriter
Grace Jones (born 1948), Jamaican singer, songwriter, record producer, actress and model
Gwyneth Jones (soprano) (born 1936), Welsh soprano
Hank Jones (1918–2010), American jazz pianist
Hannah Jones (singer), British dance music vocalist
Howard Jones (British musician) (born 1955), English singer-songwriter
Jill Jones (born 1962), American singer-songwriter
Jim Jones (rapper) (born 1976), American rapper
Jimmy Jones (singer) (1937–2012), American pop and R&B singer-songwriter
Jo Jones (1911–1985), also known as "Papa Jo Jones", American jazz drummer
John Paul Jones (musician) (born 1946), English multi-instrumentalist musician and Led Zeppelin bassist
Johnny "Yard Dog" Jones (1941–2015), American blues singer, guitarist, harmonica player, and songwriter
Jones (singer), British singer-songwriter, also known by her stage name JONES
Kelly Jones (born 1974), Welsh vocalist/guitarist of Stereophonics
Kenney Jones (born 1948), English rock drummer
Kimberly Jones (born 1974), American rapper and reality television personality known as Lil' Kim
Laurence Jones (musician) (born 1992), English blues rock guitarist, and singer-songwriter
Linda Jones (1944–1972), American soul singer
Little Sonny Jones (1931–1989), American New Orleans blues singer and songwriter
Lucie Jones (born 1991), Welsh singer
Maggie Jones (blues musician) (1894–unknown), American blues singer
Mickey Jones (1941–2018), American musician
Mick Jones (Foreigner guitarist) (born 1944), English rock guitarist and vocalist
Mick Jones (The Clash guitarist) (born 1955), English punk guitarist and vocalist
Mike Jones (rapper) (born 1981), American rapper
Nas (born Nasir Jones in 1973), American rapper
Nic Jones (born 1947), English folk singer
Nicky Wire (born 1969), Welsh musician; real name Nicholas Jones
Norah Jones (born 1979), American musician
Oliver Jones (pianist) (born 1934), Canadian jazz pianist, organist, and arranger
Paul Carey Jones (born 1974), Welsh operatic baritone
Paul Jones (singer) (born 1942), English singer, actor, TV presenter vocalist and harmonica player with Manfred Mann
Paul "Wine" Jones (1946–2005), American blues guitarist and singer
Philip Jones (musician) (1928–2000), British classical trumpeter
Philly Joe Jones (1923–1985), American jazz drummer
Quincy Jones (born 1933), American music impresario, musical arranger, record producer, and film composer
Richard D. P. Jones, English musicologist
Rickie Lee Jones (born 1954), American singer, musician, and songwriter
Rod Jones (musician) (born 1976), English guitarist, founding member of Indie band Idlewild
 Russell Tyrone Jones (1968–2004), birth name of American rapper Ol' Dirty Bastard
Samantha Jones (singer) (born 1943), English singer and entertainer and member of The Vernons Girls
Sidney Jones (composer) (1861–1946), British composer and conductor
Simon Jones (musician), British bassist with The Verve
Sharon Jones (1956–2016), American soul/funk singer
Spike Jones (1911–1965), born Lindley Armstrong Jones, American musician
Steve Jones (musician) (born 1955), English guitarist, founding member of The Sex Pistols
Tail Dragger Jones (born 1940), American Chicago blues singer
Tammy Jones (born 1944), Welsh singer
Terry Jones (singer), singer and founding member of Point of Grace
Thad Jones (1923–1986), African American jazz trumpeter, composer, and bandleader
Tom Jones (singer) (born 1940), professional name of Welsh singer Sir Thomas Woodward
Tutu Jones (born 1966), American blues guitarist, singer and songwriter
Watkin Tudor Jones (born 1974), South African rapper, better known by his stage name Ninja

Radio
Aled Jones (born 1970), Welsh singer and radio host for BBC Radio 2
Aled Haydn Jones (born 1976), Welsh radio presenter for BBC Radio 1
Ben Jones (born 1977), English radio presenter for Virgin Radio
Matt Jones (radio host) (born 1978), American sports talk radio host and attorney

Television and film
Barry Jones (magician) (born 1982), British TV magician
David John Jones (born 1943), Welsh television presenter, singer and radio broadcaster known as Dai Jones
Doreen Jones (1940–2017), British casting director
Duncan Jones (born 1971), British film director, producer and screenwriter; son of the musician David Bowie
Geoffrey Jones (1931–2005), British documentary film director and editor
Gethin Jones (born 1978), Welsh television presenter
Kenneth V. Jones (1924–2020), British film score composer
Star Jones (born 1962), American lawyer, journalist, television personality, fashion designer, author, and women's and diversity advocate
Steve Jones (Welsh presenter) (born 1977), Welsh television presenter
Tony Jones (news journalist) (born 1955), Australian TV journalist

Visual arts
Alfred Garth Jones (1872–1965), British illustrator
Allen Jones (artist) (born 1937), British sculptor
Aneurin Jones (1930–2017), Welsh painter
Barbara Jones (artist) (1912–1978), British artist and muralist
Colin Jones (artist) (1928–1967), Welsh painter
Ezzelina Jones (1921–2012), Welsh artist and sculptor
Francis William Doyle Jones (1873–1938), English sculptor
Jean Jones (artist) (1927–2012), English artist
Joe Jones (artist) (1909–1978), American painter
John Paul Jones (1924–1999), American painter and printmaker
Joy Farrall Jones (born 1933), British artist
Lucy Jones (born 1955), British artist
Nneka Jones, Trinidadian artist
Samuel Levi Jones (born 1978), American painter, assemblage artist
Wayson R. Jones, American painter

Business
Alfred Lewis Jones (1845–1909), Welsh ship-owner
Helen Jones (born 1954), British Labour Party politician
Jesse H. Jones (1874–1956), Texas businessman, politician, owner and publisher of the Houston Chronicle
Kim Jones (Sun) (born 1956/57), American IT business leader
Melvin Jones (Lions Club) (1879–1961), American businessman and founder of Lions Club
Thomas V. Jones (1920–2014), American businessman

Education
A. H. M. Jones (1904–1970), British classical scholar
Audrey Evelyn Jones (1927–2014), English teacher and campaigner for women's rights
E. D. Jones (1903–1987), Librarian of the National Library of Wales 1958–1969
Owen Glynne Jones (1867–1899), pioneering Welsh rock climber and mountaineer
Percy Mansell Jones (1889–1968), Welsh Professor of French

Law and politics

Law
B. Todd Jones (born 1957), American lawyer and Bureau of Alcohol, Tobacco, Firearms and Explosives Director
Edith Jones (born 1949), Chief Judge of the United States Court of Appeals for the Fifth Circuit
Gabriel Jones (politician) (1724–1806), member of the House of Burgesses of Virginia and Clerk of Court for Hampshire County, Virginia (now West Virginia)
James G. Jones (1814-1872), Indiana Attorney General
John E. Jones III (born 1955), American jurist and college president
John Geoffrey Jones (1928–2014), British judge
John Rice Jones (1759–1824), Welsh-born American politician, jurist and military officer
Nathaniel R. Jones (1926–2020), American jurist
Norman L. Jones (1870–1940), American jurist
Patrick Henry Jones (1830–1900), American lawyer, public servant and postmaster of New York City
Robley D. Jones (1860–1917), American politician and judge
Theodore T. Jones (1944–2012), Judge of New York State's Court of Appeals

American politics
Addison P. Jones (1822–1910), New York state senator
Alex Jones (born 1974), radio show host based in Texas
Anson Jones (1798–1858), the last president of the Republic of Texas
Brereton C. Jones (born 1939), Democratic Governor of Kentucky from 1991 to 1995
Brenda Jones (politician) (born 1959), former U.S. Representative from Michigan
Charles W. Jones (1834–1897), U.S. Senator from Florida
Daryl Jones (politician) (born 1955), Florida state senator
Denny Jones (1920–2012), American politician
Doug Jones (politician) (born 1954), U.S. Senator from Alabama
Evan John Jones (politician) (1872–1952), Republican U.S. Representative from Pennsylvania
George Jones (U.S. senator) (1766–1838), U.S. Senator from Georgia
Guy H. Jones (1911–1986), Arkansas state senator
Jamie Leigh Jones (born 1985), founder of the Jamie Leigh Foundation
Jewell Jones (born 1995), American politician
J. Charles Jones (1937–2019), American lawyer and civil rights activist
J. Weldon Jones (1896–1981), American administrator and acting High Commissioner to the Philippines
Kizziah J. Bills (1860–1924), maiden name Kizziah Jones, Black American suffragist, correspondent and columnist for Black press in Chicago, civil rights activist
LaDawn Jones (born 1980), American politician and lawyer
Moze Hunt Jones (1883–1914), member of the Mississippi House of Representatives
Owen Jones (1819-1878), Democratic member of the U.S. House of Representative from Pennsylvania
Paula Jones (born 1966), former Arkansas state employee who sued President Bill Clinton for sexual harassment
Shirley M. Jones (1939–2016), American politician
Spencer Cone Jones (1836–1915), President of the Maryland State Senate from 1901–1905
Stiles P. Jones (1822-1861), Minnesota state senator and lawyer
Tishaura Jones (born 1972), Mayor of St. Louis
Van Jones (born 1968), Green Jobs Advisor to the Obama administration
Walter B. Jones Jr. (1943–2019), Republican member of the U.S. House of Representatives from North Carolina
Wendell E. Jones (1937–2011), Illinois state senator
Wesley Livsey Jones (1863–1932), U.S. Representative and Senator from Washington state

United Kingdom politics
Alun Ffred Jones (born 1949), Welsh Plaid Cymru politician
Andrew Jones (British politician) (born 1963), Conservative MP for Harrogate and Knaresborough (2010–present)
Ann Jones (politician) (born 1953), Welsh Labour Co-op politician
Barry Jones, Baron Jones (born 1938), Labour politician and MP for Alyn and Deeside (1970–2001)
Caroline Jones (politician) (born 1955), Welsh independent politician
Claudia Jones (1915–1964), Trinidad-born journalist and activist
David Brynmor Jones (1851–1921), Welsh barrister and politician
Denise Idris Jones (1950–2020), Welsh Labour Member of the Welsh Assembly (2003–2007)
Elin Jones (born 1966), Welsh Plaid Cymru politician
Elwyn Jones, Baron Elwyn-Jones (1909–1989), Welsh Labour politician
Elwyn Jones (solicitor) (1904–1989), Welsh Labour politician
Ernest Charles Jones (1819–1868), British orator, poet, and politician 
Fay Jones (born 1985), Welsh Conservative politician
Gareth Jones (politician) (born 1939), Welsh Plaid Cymru politician
Helen Jones (born 1954), British Labour Party politician
Helen Mary Jones (born 1960), Welsh Plaid Cyrmru politician
Ieuan Wyn Jones (born 1949), leader of Plaid Cymru, Deputy First Minister in the Welsh Assembly Government
Jackie Jones, Welsh Labour politician
Jon Owen Jones (born 1954), Welsh Labour Co-op politician
Laura Anne Jones (born 1979), Welsh Conservative Member of the Welsh Assembly (2003–2007)
Leif Jones (1862–1939) Welsh Liberal Party politician and Privy Councillor
Maggie Jones, Baroness Jones of Whitchurch, British Labour Peer and trade union official
Mandy Jones, Welsh Brexit Party politician
Morgan Jones (1886–1939), Welsh Labour politician
Nigel Jones, Baron Jones of Cheltenham (1948–2022), English Liberal Democrat
Philip Asterley Jones (1914–1978), British Labour politician
Robert Jones (Conservative politician) (1950–2007), English Conservative politician
Ruth Jones (born 1962), Welsh Labour politician
Susan Elan Jones (born 1968), Welsh Labour MP (2010–2019)
Theobald Jones (1790–1868), also known as Toby Jones, Irish officer in the Royal Navy, MP for County Londonderry, and lichenologist
Towyn Jones (1858–1925), Welsh Liberal politician

Other politics
Barry Jones (Australian politician) (born 1932), Australian politician
Jim Jones (Canadian politician) (born 1943), Canadian MP for Markham (1997–2000)
Yvonne Jones (born 1968), Canadian MP for Labrador (2013–present)

Literature

Writers
Alice Gray Jones (1852–1943), Welsh writer and editor
Cleolinda Jones, American writer and blogger
Constance Jones (born circa 1857), English educator and writer on logic and ethics
Dan Jones (writer), British historian and writer
Dennis Feltham Jones (1917–1981), British science fiction author
Diana Wynne Jones (1934–2011), British fantasy novelist
E. B. C. Jones (1893–1966), British novelist
Ebenezer Jones (1820–1860), English poet
Edgar Dewitt Jones (1876–1956), American clergyman and author
Feminista Jones (fl. 2010s), American writer and activist
Gail Jones (writer) (born 1955), Australian novelist and academic
Gayl Jones (born 1949), African American poet and novelist
Howard Andrew Jones, American speculative fiction author
Ida E. Jones (historian) (born 1970), American archivist and author
Ivan Jones (author) (fl. 2000s–2010s), British writer
J. V. Jones (born 1963), British fantasy author
James Jones (author) (1921–1977), American writer of WWII novels
John Gwilym Jones, (1904–1988), Welsh dramatist, fiction-writer and critic
Lara Jones (1975–2010), British children's author
Liz Jones (born 1958), English journalist and writer
Mal Lewis Jones British author
Pamela Jones, computer law scholar, founder and editor of Groklaw
Raymond F. Jones (1915–1994), American science fiction author
Rhiannon Davies Jones (1921–2014), Welsh historical novelist
Rod Jones (author), Australian writer
T. Llew Jones (1915–2009), Welsh language writer

Military

Arnold Elzey, born Arnold Elzey Jones (1816–1871), Confederate general during the American Civil War
Don A. Jones (1912–2000), American admiral and civil engineer, seventh Director of the United States Coast and Geodetic Survey and second Director of the Environmental Science Services Administration Corps
E. H. Jones (author) (1883–1942), British prisoner of war
Ernest Lester Jones (1876–1929), American colonel, last Superintendent (1915–1919) and first Director (1919–1929) of the United States Coast and Geodetic Survey
George L. Jones (1918–1997), Korean War flying ace
H. Jones (1940–1982), British posthumous recipient of the Victoria Cross
Hilary P. Jones (1863–1938), American naval officer
Jacob Jones (1768–1850), American naval officer
James L. Jones (born 1943), United States Marine Corps officer
John Jones Maesygarnedd (c. 1597–1660), English Civil War Parliamentary military officer executed for regicide
John Paul Jones (1747–1792), American naval captain
Michael Jones (soldier) (c. 1606–1649), Irish Confederate War and English Civil War Parliamentary military officer
Patrick Henry Jones (1830–1900), Union brigadier general
Philip Jones of Fonmon (1618–1674), English Civil War Parliamentary military officer and comptroller of Oliver Cromwell's household
Philip Jones (Royal Navy officer) (born 1960), Royal Navy officer
Victor Jones (British Army officer) (1898–?), British Army officer

Mathematics and science

Astronomy
Albert F. A. L. Jones (1920–2013), New Zealand astronomer
John Jones (astronomer) (1818–1898), Welsh amateur astronomer
Rhian Jones (born 1960), British planetary scientist

Archeology
Vendyl Jones (1930–2010), American scholar

Biology
Chonnettia Jones, American geneticist and developmental biologist
E. Yvonne Jones, British molecular biologist
Evan Benjamin Gareth Jones (born 1937), British mycologist
Holly Jones (ecologist), American restoration ecologist and conservation biologist
Monty Jones (born 1951), Sierra Leonean biologist and plant breeder
Steve Jones (biologist) (born 1944), Welsh geneticist, biologist and writer

Chemistry
Alan A. Jones (1944–2006), American chemistry professor
David E. H. Jones (1938–2017), British chemist and writer (pseudonym Daedalus of DREADCO)
Harry Clary Jones (1865–1916), American physical chemist
Humphrey Owen Jones (1878–1912), Welsh chemist and mountaineer

Computer science
Cliff Jones (computer scientist) (born 1944), British computer scientist
Karen Spärck Jones (1935–2007), British computer scientist
Paul Jones (computer technologist) (born 1950), American computer technologist

Economics
Richard Jones (economist) (1790–1855), English macro economist

Engineering
Harry Edward Jones (1843–1925), British civil engineer
Willard F. Jones (1890–1967), American naval architect

Geology
Thomas Rupert Jones (1819–1911), British geologist and palaeontologist

Linguistics and philology
William Jones (philologist) (1746–1794), British pioneer of Indo-European studies

Mathematics
Burton Wadsworth Jones (1902–1983), American mathematician
F. Burton Jones (1910–1999), American mathematician
John Viriamu Jones (1856–1901), British mathematician and physicist
Peter Jones (mathematician) (born 1952), American mathematician
Thomas Jones (mathematician) (1756–1807), British mathematician
Vaughan Jones (1952–2020), New Zealand mathematician
William Jones (mathematician) (1675–1749), Welsh mathematician

Medicine
Barrie R. Jones (1921–2009), New Zealand & British ophthalmologist
Edith Irby Jones (1927–2019), American physician
Henry Bence Jones (1813–1873), British physician and chemist
Mabel Jones (c. 1865–1923), British physician and suffragette sympathiser
Philip Sydney Jones (1836–1918), Australian surgeon
Sir Robert Jones, 1st Baronet (1857–1933), British orthopedic surgeon
T. Duckett Jones (1899–1954), American physician, cardiologist, and medical researcher
Trevor M. Jones (born 1942), visiting professor at King's College, University of London and former head of R&D at Wellcome

Physics
Reginald Victor Jones (1911–1997), English physicist
Robert Clark Jones (1916–2004), American physicist

Psychology
Edward E. Jones (1927–1993), American social psychologist

Religion
Christopher Jones (bishop) (1936–2018), Bishop of the Diocese of Elphin
Jenkin Lloyd Jones (1843–1918), American Unitarian missionary, minister and father of newspaper publisher Richard Lloyd Jones
Jim Jones (1931–1978), American founder of the People's Temple 
Malachi Jones (clergyman) (c.1651–1729), Welsh Presbyterian missionary in America
Noël Jones (bishop of Sodor and Man) (1932–2009), Welsh bishop in the Church of England
Noel Jones (Pentecostal bishop) (born 1950), senior pastor of the City of Refuge Church in Gardena, California
Paul Jones (bishop) (1880–1941), Protestant Episcopal Bishop of Utah, USA and pacifist
Ray Jones (chaplain) (born 1934), Anglican priest
Robert Elijah Jones (1872–1960), Protestant Episcopal Bishop and civil rights advocate
Serene Jones (born 1959), American academic

Sports

Association football
Alexander Jones (footballer) (1854–1878), Welsh international footballer
Barrie Jones (born 1941), Welsh footballer
Brad Jones (soccer) (born 1982), Australian goalkeeper
Bryn Jones (footballer, born 1912) (1912–1985), Welsh footballer
Bryn Jones (footballer, born 1931) (1931–1990), Welsh footballer
Bryn Jones (footballer, born 1938), English professional footballer
Bryn Jones (footballer, born 1939), Welsh footballer
Bryn Jones (footballer, born 1948), Welsh footballer
Cliff Jones (Welsh footballer) (born 1935), Welsh international footballer who played for Tottenham
Cobi Jones (born 1970), American soccer player
Dai Jones (footballer, born 1941), Welsh footballer
Dan Jones (footballer, born 1994), English footballer
Dan Jones (New Zealand footballer) (born 1986), New Zealand footballer
Daniel Jones (footballer) (born 1983), English footballer
Darren Jones, English footballer
Dave Jones (footballer, born 1932) (1932–2022), Welsh footballer
Dave Jones (footballer, born 1956), English footballer and manager
David Jones (footballer), several people
Emlyn Jones, Welsh footballer
Ernie Jones (1920–2002), Welsh footballer
Ivor Jones (footballer) (1899–1974), Welsh international footballer
Jermaine Jones (born 1981), American footballer
Jimmy Jones (footballer, born 1876) (1876–1???), English footballer
Jimmy Jones (footballer, born 1895) (1895–1966), Welsh international footballer
Jimmy Jones (footballer, born 1889) (1889–1???), English footballer
Jimmy Jones (footballer, born 1919) (1919–1976), Welsh footballer
Jimmy Jones (footballer, born 1928) (1928–2014), Northern Ireland international football player
Jimmy Jones (footballer, born 1927) (1927–2015), English football goalkeeper
Jodi Jones (footballer) (born 1997), English professional footballer
Joe Jones (footballer) (1887–1941), Welsh international footballer
Joey Jones (born 1955), Welsh footballer
Kenwyne Jones (born 1984), Trinidad and Tobago footballer
Leslie Jones (footballer) (1911–1981), Welsh footballer
Linda Jones (jockey) (born 1952), New Zealand thoroughbred horse racing jockey
Linden Jones (born 1961), Welsh footballer
Lot Jones (William Jones) (1882–1941), Welsh international footballer
Miguel Jones (1938–2020), Spanish footballer
Nico Jones (born 2002), English footballer
Owain Tudur Jones (born 1984), Welsh footballer
Pat Jones (footballer, born 1920) (1920–1990), English footballer
Paul Jones (footballer, born 1967), Welsh goalkeeper
Phil Jones (footballer, born 1961), English footballer
Phil Jones (footballer, born 1992), English footballer who played for Manchester United
Ritchie Jones (born 1986), English footballer
Rob Jones (footballer, born 1971), English footballer
Sammy Jones (footballer) (1911–1993), Northern Irish footballer
Steve Jones (footballer, born 1976), Northern Irish footballer
T. G. Jones (1917–2004), Welsh footballer
Tommy Jones (footballer, born 1907) (1907–1980), English footballer
Vinnie Jones (born 1965), British footballer-turned-actor
Wayne Jones (footballer) (born 1948), Welsh international footballer

American football
Aaron Jones (running back) (born 1994), American football player
Adam Jones (American football) (born 1983), cornerback
Arrington Jones (born 1959), running back
Bert Jones (born 1951), quarterback
Benito Jones (born 1997), defensive tackle
Braxton Jones (born 1999), American football player
Brian Jones (quarterback) (born 1980), quarterback
Butch Jones (born 1968), head coach
Cardale Jones (born 1992), quarterback
Chandler Jones (born 1990), linebacker
Daniel Jones (American football) (born 1997), quarterback
Dawand Jones (born 2001), offensive tackle
Deacon Jones (1938–2013), defensive end
Deion Jones (born 1994), Linebacker
Dominic Jones (born 1987), defensive back
Dre'Mont Jones (born 1997), defensive end
Ed "Too Tall" Jones (born 1950), defensive end for the Dallas Cowboys
Emory Jones (born 2000), American football player
Freddie Jones (born 1974), tight end
Howard Jones (American football coach) (1885–1941)
Jacoby Jones (born 1984), wide receiver
Jamarco Jones (born 1996), offensive tackle
James Jones (wide receiver) (born 1984), wide receiver
Jamir Jones (born 1998), American football player
Jarvis Jones (born 1989), linebacker 
Jay Jones (American football) (born 1974), wide receiver 
Jaylon Jones (born 1997), American football player
Jerry Jones (born 1942), executive, owner of the Dallas Cowboys
J. J. Jones (wide receiver) (born 1992)
Josh Jones (safety) (born 1994)
Julio Jones (born 1989), wide receiver
Keandre Jones (born 1997), linebacker
Kobe Jones (born 1998), American football player
Korey Jones (born 1989), linebacker
LaKendrick Jones (born 1979), lineman
Leroy Jones (American football) (1950–2021), defensive end
Mac Jones (born 1998), American football player
Malachi Jones (gridiron football) (born 1994), wide receiver
Manny Jones (born 1999), American football player
Marcus Jones (cornerback) (born 1998), American football player
Naquan Jones (born 1999), defensive tackle
Nazair Jones (born 1994), defensive tackle
Nick Jones (American football) (born 1985), center
Rod Jones (cornerback) (born 1964), cornerback
Rod Jones (offensive lineman) (born 1974), offensive tackle
Ronald Jones (running back) (born 1997), running back
Seantavius Jones (born 1992), wide receiver
Sidney Jones (American football) (born 1996), cornerback
Terren Jones (born 1991), offensive tackle
Terry Jones (defensive tackle) (born 1956), former NFL defensive tackle
Terry Jones (tight end) (born 1979), former NFL tight end
Tevin Jones (born 1992), wide receiver
Vi Jones (born 1998), American football player
Velus Jones Jr. (born 1997), wide receiver
Victor Jones (linebacker) (born 1966)
Victor Jones (running back) (born 1967)
Xavier Jones (born 1997), American football player
Zay Jones (born 1995), wide receiver

Baseball
Adam Jones (baseball) (born 1985), outfielder
Andruw Jones (born 1977), Curaçaoan outfielder
Chipper Jones (born 1972), American third baseman (Atlanta Braves, 1993–2012)
Damon Jones (baseball) (born 1994), American baseball player
Fielder Jones (1871–1934), American baseball player and manager
Garrett Jones (born 1981) American Major League outfielder and first baseman
Gordon Jones (baseball) (1930–1994), Major League pitcher
Itch Jones (born 1938), American college baseball coach
JaCoby Jones (born 1992), American outfielder
Jacque Jones (born 1975), American outfielder
Jahmai Jones (born 1997), American outfielder
Jones (left fielder), unidentified baseball player for the Washington Nationals in 1884
Jones (third baseman), unidentified baseball player for the New York Metropolitans in 1885
Nolan Jones (born 1998), American baseball player
Rick Jones, American college baseball coach
Ruppert Jones (born 1955), outfielder
Sheldon Jones (1922–1991), American baseball player
Taylor Jones (born 1993), American baseball player
Terry Jones (born 1971), former outfielder
Tex Jones (1885–1938), Chicago White Sox first baseman
Tracy Jones (born 1961), former outfielder and current co-host on WLW radio in Cincinnati

Basketball
Cameron Jones (born 1989), American shooting guard
Carolyn Jones-Young (born 1969), American guard
Chris Jones (basketball, born 1993), American basketball player in the Israeli Basketball Premier League
Dahntay Jones (born 1980), American small forward/shooting guard
DeVante' Jones (born 1998), American basketball player
Domonic Jones (born 1981), American point guard/shooting guard
Eddie Jones (basketball) (born 1971), American shooting guard/small forward
Edgar Jones (basketball) (born 1956), American power forward/center
Fred Jones (basketball) (born 1979), American shooting guard/point guard
Haley Jones (born 2001), American basketball player
Jake Jones (basketball) (born 1949), American shooting guard
Jalen Jones (born 1993), American basketball player in the Israeli Basketball Premier League
K. C. Jones (1932–2020), American basketball player and coach
L. Tucker Jones (born Leigh Tucker Jones, 1888–1943), American college basketball coach
Lamont Jones (basketball, born 1972), American basketball player
Marvin Jones (basketball) (born 1993), American basketball player in the Israeli Basketball Premier League
Lazeric Jones (born 1990), American point guard
Phill Jones (born 1974), New Zealand professional basketball player
Sacha Killeya-Jones (born 1998), American-British basketball player for Hapoel Gilboa Galil of the Israeli Basketball Premier League
Shawn Jones (basketball) (born 1992), American center/power forward
Shelton Jones (born 1966), American basketball player
Steve "Snapper" Jones (1942–2017), American basketball player and television analyst
Terrence Jones (born 1992), American power forward
Tre Jones (born 2000), American point guard
Tyrique Jones (born 1997), American basketball player in the Israeli Basketball Premier League

Boxing
Frankie Jones (boxer) (1933–1991), Scottish professional boxer of the 1950s and 1960s
Paul Jones (boxer) (born 1966), British former professional boxer
Reggie Jones (boxer) (born 1951), American boxer
Roy Jones Jr. (born 1969), American boxing champion
Tiger Jones (1928–1994), American boxer

Cricket
Alfred Jones (Northamptonshire cricketer) (1900–1986)
Alfred Jones (Kent cricketer)
Dean Jones (cricketer) (born 1961), Australian cricketer
Ernie Jones (Australian sportsman) (1869–1943), Australian bowler
Geraint Jones (born 1976), England and Papua New Guinea player
Jeff Jones (cricketer, born 1941), Welsh cricketer
Sammy Jones (1861–1951), Australian Test player
Simon Jones (cricketer) (born 1978), England and Wales player
Steffan Jones (born 1974), Welsh cricketer
Jones (Essex cricketer) (fl. 1787)
Jones (Godalming cricketer) (fl. 1820s), English player for Surrey
Jones (MCC cricketer) (fl. 1816–1830)
Jones (Sussex cricketer) (fl. 1832–1833)

MMA
Jon Jones (fighter) (born 1987), American mixed martial artist and a former two-time UFC Light Heavyweight Champion
Paul Jones (mixed martial artist) (born 1963), former mixed martial artist

Motor racing
Adam Jones (racing driver) (born 1980), British racer in the British Touring Car Championship
Alan Jones (racing driver) (born 1946), Australian Formula One World Champion
Andrew Jones (racing driver) (born 1980), Australian V8 Supercar racing driver
Brad Jones (racing driver) (born 1960), Australian racing driver and team owner
Brandon Jones (racing driver) (born 1997), American NASCAR driver
Buckshot Jones (born 1970), American NASCAR driver
Erik Jones (born 1996), American NASCAR driver 
Parnelli Jones (born 1933), American former professional racing driver and racing team owner
P. J. Jones (born 1969), American professional racing driver
Stan Jones (racing driver) (1923–1973), Australian racing driver

Rugby league
Lewis Jones (rugby) (born 1931), Welsh rugby union, and rugby league footballer of the 1940s, 1950s and 1960s
Stacey Jones (born 1976), New Zealand rugby league footballer
Steve Jones (rugby league), English rugby league footballer of the 2000s

Rugby union
Adam Jones (rugby union, born 1980), Wales rugby union international lock forward
Adam Jones (rugby union, born 1981), Wales rugby union international prop forward
Alun Wyn Jones (born 1985), Wales international rugby union player 
Daniel Jones (rugby union) (1875–1959), Wales rugby union player
Duncan Jones (rugby union) (born 1978), Wales rugby union player
Elvet Jones (1912–1989), Wales and British Lions rugby international
Gwyn Jones (rugby union) (born 1972), Wales rugby union player
Ivor Jones (1901–1982), Wales rugby union player
Kingsley Jones (rugby union, born 1969), Welsh rugby union player and coach
Robert Jones (rugby union, born 1965) (born 1965), Wales rugby union player
Ryan Jones (born 1981), Wales rugby union player
Stephen Jones (rugby union) (born 1977), Wales rugby union player

Swimming
Alyson Jones (born 1956), English swimmer
Burwell Jones (1933–2021), American swimmer
Cullen Jones (born 1984), American swimmer
Jenna Jones (born 2001), Australian swimmer
Leisel Jones (born 1985), Australian swimmer

Track and field (athletics)
Akela Jones (born 1995), Barbadian track and field athlete
Barbara Jones (sprinter) (born 1937), American sprinter
Deacon Jones (athlete) (1934–2007), American runner
Earl Jones (athlete) (born 1964), American runner
Esther Jones (athlete) (born 1969), American sprinter
Hayes Jones (born 1938), American hurdler
John Paul Jones (athlete) (1890–1970), American runner
Lam Jones (1958–2019), American sprinter and football player
Lolo Jones (born 1982), American hurdler (and also bobsled pusher)
Lou Jones (athlete) (1932–2006), American sprinter
Marion Jones (born 1975), American sprinter (and also basketball player)
Samuel Jones (athlete) (1880–1954), American high jumper

Other sports
Alun Jones (tennis) (born 1980), Australian professional tennis player
Beth Bronger-Jones, American curler
Colleen Jones (born 1959), Canadian curler and television personality
Doug Jones (curler), American curler
Eric Jones (climber) (born 1935), Welsh mountaineer
Heather Jones (born 1970), Canadian field hockey player
Jade Jones (taekwondo) (born 1993), Welsh double Olympic champion in taekwondo
Jennifer Jones (curler) (born 1974), Canadian curler
Julia Jones-Pugliese (1909–1993), née Jones, American national champion fencer and fencing coach
Kirsty Jones, Welsh professional kitesurfer
Max Jones (born 1998), American ice hockey player
Rufus R. Jones (1933–1993), American professional wrestler
Paul Jones (wrestler) (1942–2018), retired professional wrestler and manager
S. D. Jones (1945–2008), Antiguan professional wrestler
Seth Jones (born 1994), American ice hockey player
Tammy Jones, stage name of Debbie D'Amato, professional wrestler from the Gorgeous Ladies of Wrestling
Wayne Jones (darts player) (born 1965), English darts player
Wayne Jones (snooker player) (born 1959), Welsh snooker player

Sports executives
Whip Jones (1909–2001), American businessman and philanthropist, founder of Aspen Highlands

Miscellaneous
April Jones (2007–2012), Welsh murder victim
Casey Jones (1864–1900), American locomotive engineer, subject of an eponymous song
Gareth Jones (journalist) (1905–1935), Welsh journalist
Harold Jones (murderer) (1906–1971), British child murderer 
Holly Jones (died 2003), Canadian female murder victim
Jodi Jones (died 2013), British female murder victim
Kirsty Jones (died 2000), British female murder victim
Marlon Jones (c. 1970–1980), Jamaican criminal
Phoenix Jones (born 1988), American real-life superhero
Sally-Anne Jones (1968–2017), British-born terrorist and UN-designated recruiter who is believed to have been killed
Sally Jones (journalist) (born 1954), British journalist

Fictional characters
 Alfred F. Jones, aka America from Hetalia
 Angelica "Angel" Jones, secret identity of Marvel superheroine Firestar
B. J. Jones, a character from the American soap opera General Hospital
Bridget Jones, a novel and film character
Bustopher Jones, from the musical Cats
 Carly Jones, in the film House of Wax
Casey Jones, human ally of the Teenage Mutant Ninja Turtles
 Charming Jones, the female lead in the 1979 Hal Needham film The Villain
Cleopatra Jones, heroine of the 1973 blaxploitation film of the same name
 Coraline Jones, the titular protagonist of the film Coraline and the book of the same name.
Cyrano Jones, a minor Star Trek character dealing in Tribbles
Davy Jones, main villain in the latter two installments of the Pirates of the Caribbean series
Dijonay Jones, a main character in The Proud Family
 Christmas Jones, Bond girl in The World Is Not Enough
Eugene Jones, a one-off character on the BBC Three television series Torchwood
 Daisy Jones, fictional lead singer of Daisy Jones & The Six
Felicia Jones, from the American soap opera General Hospital
Flattop Jones, a.k.a. Floyd Jones Sr. a villain from Dick Tracy media
Fred Jones, a main character in the Scooby-Doo franchise
Frisco Jones, from the American soap opera General Hospital
Georgie Jones, from the American soap opera General Hospital
 Gwenog Jones, captain of the Holyhead Harpies, a Welsh Quidditch team in the Harry Potter books
Harriet Jones, British Prime Minister in Doctor Who
 Hezekiah Jones, main character of the 1948 poem "Black Cross (Hezekiah Jones)" by Joseph Simon Newman
Hestia Jones, a member of the Order of the Phoenix in the Harry Potter series
Ianto Jones, a character in the BBC Three television series Torchwood
Indiana Jones, titular main character of the Indiana Jones franchise
Jessica Jones, Marvel Comics comic book character
Jimbo Jones, bully from The Simpsons
Jughead Jones, from Archie Comics
Junie B. Jones, the titular main character of the children's book series by Barbara Park
Jones, the overthrown farmer in George Orwell's novel Animal Farm
Lance-Corporal Jack Jones, a character from Dad's Army
Larvelle Jones, one of the main characters in the Police Academy franchise
Loretta Jones, from the British soap opera Hollyoaks
Lucas Jones, from the American soap opera General Hospital
Martha Jones, a companion in the science fiction series Doctor Who
Maxie Jones, from the American soap opera General Hospital
Mercedes Jones, on television series Glee
Mia Jones, in Degrassi: The Next Generation
Michelle "MJ" Jones, a character from the Marvel Cinematic Universe
Morgan Jones, a character in The Walking Dead franchise
Neighbor Jones, Donald Duck's neighbor in Disney comics
Osmosis Jones, the titular character of a 2001 Warner Brothers animated film
Professor Jones, a character from Freakazoid!
Ralf Jones, from the SNK video game series
Robot Jones, the main character in the Cartoon Network show Whatever Happened to... Robot Jones?
Deputy S. Jones, a character in Reno 911!
Sam Jones, a character in the Doctor Who novel series Eighth Doctor Adventures
Samantha Jones, a character in the television series Sex and the City
Tamika Jones, a character in the Netflix series Grand Army
Tony Jones, from the American soap opera General Hospital

Disambiguation pages
Adam Jones (disambiguation)
Alan Jones (disambiguation)
Albert Jones (disambiguation)
Alex Jones (disambiguation)
Alfred Jones (disambiguation)
Allan Jones (disambiguation)
Allen Jones (disambiguation)
Alun Jones (disambiguation)
Anthony Jones (disambiguation)
Arthur Jones (disambiguation)
Barry Jones (disambiguation)
Bill Jones (disambiguation)
Billy Jones (disambiguation)
Bob Jones (disambiguation)
Bobby Jones (disambiguation)
Brandon Jones (disambiguation)
Brian Jones (disambiguation)
Bruce Jones (disambiguation)
Bryn Jones (disambiguation)
Caleb Jones (disambiguation)
Charles Jones (disambiguation)
Christopher Jones (disambiguation)
Cliff Jones (disambiguation)
Damon Jones (disambiguation)
Daniel Jones (disambiguation)
David Jones (disambiguation)
Davy Jones (disambiguation)
Dean Jones (disambiguation)
Dennis Jones (disambiguation)
Derrick Jones (disambiguation)
Diana Jones (disambiguation)
D. J. Jones (disambiguation)
Doug Jones (disambiguation)
Edward Jones (disambiguation)
Elizabeth Jones (disambiguation)
Ernest Jones (disambiguation)
Fred Jones (disambiguation)
Frederick Jones (disambiguation)
Gary Jones (disambiguation)
George Jones (disambiguation)
Gwyneth Jones (disambiguation)
Henry Jones (disambiguation)
Howard Jones (disambiguation)
Jack Jones (disambiguation)
James Jones (disambiguation)
Jamie Jones (disambiguation)
Jeff Jones (disambiguation)
Jennifer Jones (disambiguation)
Jenny Jones (disambiguation)
Jim Jones (disambiguation)
Jimmy Jones (disambiguation)
Joe Jones (disambiguation)
Joey Jones (disambiguation)
John Jones (disambiguation)
Jon Jones (disambiguation)
Jonathan Jones (disambiguation)
Joseph Jones (disambiguation)
Joshua Jones (disambiguation)
Julius Jones (disambiguation)
Keith Jones (disambiguation)
Kevin Jones (disambiguation)
Kim Jones (disambiguation)
Lee Jones (disambiguation)
Lewis Jones (disambiguation)
Lloyd Jones (disambiguation)
Margaret Jones (disambiguation)
Marilyn Jones (disambiguation)
Mark Jones (disambiguation)
Martin Jones (disambiguation)
Mary Jones (disambiguation)
Matthew Jones (disambiguation)
Michael Jones (disambiguation)
Mick Jones (disambiguation)
Morgan Jones (disambiguation)
Oliver Jones (disambiguation)
Owen Jones (disambiguation)
Patrick Jones (disambiguation)
Paul Jones (disambiguation)
Peter Jones (disambiguation)
Richard Jones (disambiguation)
Rick Jones (disambiguation)
Ricky Jones (disambiguation)
Robert Jones (disambiguation)
Ron Jones (disambiguation)
Russell Jones (disambiguation)
Samantha Jones (disambiguation)
Samuel Jones (disambiguation)
Sarah Jones (disambiguation)
Shirley Jones (disambiguation)
Simon Jones (disambiguation)
Stephen Jones (disambiguation)
Steve Jones (disambiguation)
Ted Jones (disambiguation)
Thomas Jones (disambiguation)
Tom Jones (disambiguation)
Tony Jones (disambiguation)
Trevor Jones (disambiguation)
Will Jones (disambiguation)
William Jones (disambiguation)
Willie Jones (disambiguation)

Lists of people by surname